Diego Hidalgo and Cristian Rodríguez were the defending champions but chose not to defend their title.

Santiago Rodríguez Taverna and Thiago Agustín Tirante won the title after defeating Benjamin and Courtney John Lock 7–6(13–11), 6–3 in the final.

Seeds

Draw

References

External links
 Main draw

Ambato La Gran Ciudad - Doubles